The Aboriginal and Islander Sports Hall of Fame was established in 1994 to recognise Indigenous Australians (Aboriginal and Torres Strait Islander people) that have achieved at the highest level of their chosen sport. It was a joint project of the Aboriginal and Torres Strait Islander Commission (ATSIC) and Macquarie University, under the management of Colin Tatz. Inductees are sometimes referred to as "Black Diamonds", being the name of the first book of the project, published in 1996.

History

The Hall of Fame was an outcome of Chris "Honky" Clark, a director of Aboriginal-owned and -operated sports complex in Condobolin, New South Wales. Clark saw the need to inspire indigenous youth through sports photographs. The costs of establishing a permanent photographic exhibition was too expensive. Musician and historian Ted Egan recommended a low-cost book. The outcome was the book Black Diamonds: The Aboriginal and Islander Sports Hall of Fame, published in 1996.

The Hall of Fame was a joint project of ATSIC and Macquarie University, under the management of Colin Tatz with photography by Paul Tatz.

The inaugural list of 129 members was determined by well-known Indigenous athletes: Mark Ella; Sydney Jackson; Faith Thomas; and Charlie Perkins. They were assisted by three non-Indigenous historians: Ted Egan; Colin Tatz; and Alick Jackomos.

In 1999, the list of members was increased by 43. The 1999 selection committee comprised: Arthur Beetson; Evonne Goolagong Cawley; Lloyd McDermott; Mark Ella; Gary Ella; Charlie Perkins, Ted Egan, Ken Edwards, and Tatz. The committee was assisted by three statisticians/historians: Colin Hutchinson (Australian rules footballer), David Middleton (rugby league player) and George Bracken (boxing). After the 1999 selection, the full list of 172 members with brief biographies was published in the book Black Gold : the Aboriginal and Islander Sports Hall of Fame.

As of 2000 there was no permanent home for the Hall of Fame, but there had been several photographic exhibitions in Australia. Colin and Paul Tatz donated 110 photographs from the Sports Hall of Fame to the Australian Institute of Aboriginal and Torres Strait Islander Studies (AIATSIS).

The 2008 selection panel included seven Aboriginal selectors: Arthur Beetson; Carl Currey; Gary Ella; Sydney Jackson; Lloyd McDermott; John Maynard; and Nova Peris. 

The 2018 selection panel comprised Gary Ella, Katrina Fanning, Gilbert McAdam, John  Maynard, Nova Peris, David Middleton, George Bracken, ColHutchinson and Colin and Paul Tatz. In 2018, there were 276 members of the Hall of Fame.

Selection criteria

Members were selected if they met the following selection criteria:
represented Australia or their state/territory
held a national or international record or title
achieved a notable first or distinguished performance
in the case of Australian football, were acclaimed senior players and/or medal winners
had notable success as referees or umpires
those who through their coaching, administration or organisation have helped create Indigenous teams and a space for them in competitions
person's contribution to Aboriginal or Islander identity

Members
Inductees are sometimes referred to as "Black Diamonds".

See also

National Aboriginal and Torres Strait Islander Sports Awards

References

Further reading
 Tatz, Colin (1987), Aborigines in sport, Australian Society for Sports History, Bedford Park, S. Aust.
 Tatz, Colin (1995), Obstacle race : Aborigines in sport, New South Wales University Press, Sydney, 
 Tatz, Colin and Tatz, Paul (1996), Black diamonds : the Aboriginal and Islander Sports Hall of Fame, Allen & Unwin, Sydney 
 Tatz, Colin and Tatz, Paul (2000), Black gold : the Aboriginal and Islander Sports Hall of Fame, Aboriginal Studies Press, Canberra 
 Tatz, Colin and Tatz, Paul (2018), Black Pearls : the Aboriginal and Islander Sports Hall of Fame, Aboriginal Studies Press, Canberra 
Mabel Crouch (Campbell) and Edna Newfong (Crouch). Queensland Women Cricketing Greats.

Australian sports trophies and awards
All-sports halls of fame
Halls of fame in Australia
Indigenous Australian sport
Awards honoring indigenous people
Sports museums in Australia
Museums established in 1994
1994 establishments in Australia